JFG may refer to:
 JFG Coffee Company
 Japanese Friendship Garden (disambiguation)
 (...And the JFG?), a musical album by Lo-Fi-Fnk